Guariba Arára (Arara do Rio Guariba, or Arara of Guariba River) is a poorly attested Tupian language of the Monde branch. It is spoken on the Guariba River in the northern part of Aripuanã Indigenous Park of Rondônia and Mato Grosso, Brazil.

According to Moore (2005), Arara do Rio Guariba is closely related to the Cinta Larga dialect cluster, and also shares some features with Suruí. 26 words were collected by Hargreaves in 2001. It remains unclassified due to the lack of data.

Vocabulary
Below are the Arara do Rio Guariba words that Inês Hargreaves had elicited from D. Nazaré Medina Arara on June 12, 2001:

{| class="wikitable sortable"
! Portuguese gloss (original) !! English gloss (translated) !! Arara do Rio Guariba
|-
| água || water || itxera / ĩtʃera
|-
| peixe (pacu) || pacu || mborip kabɛ
|-
| anta || tapir || waøa / wasa
|-
| mutum || curassow || wakuia / wakuya
|-
| arara || macaw || awala / awalap
|-
| cujubim || red-throated piping guan || tuap / twap
|-
| macaco-barrigudo || woolly monkey || mbasai kot
|-
| coatá || spider monkey || alimɛ’
|-
| jacamim || trumpeter || tamalia / tamaliap
|-
| caititu || collared peccary || mbɛbɛcot / mbebecot
|-
| queixada || white-lipped peccary || mbɛbɛ
|-
| criança homem || boy || oi
|-
| criança mulher || girl || kuña
|-
| onça || jaguar || mbeku
|-
| gato (maracajá) || margay || mbeku
|-
| banana || banana || mbukuba / mukuba
|-
| aranha || spider || saipɛ
|-
| olho || eye || ña kap / oña kap
|-
| pé || foot || pipɛ
|-
| guariba || howler monkey || ʔalimɛ
|-
| cutia || agouti || wakĩn
|-
| veado || deer || itiap / tiap
|-
| filho || son || kuiã
|-
| jacu || guan || tanoap
|-
| água || water || itʃera
|-
| cinta larga || Cinta Larga people || ’kurumĩn
|}

References

Tupian languages
Mamoré–Guaporé linguistic area